Stellman is a surname. Notable people with the surname include:

Louis J. Stellman (1877–1961), American photographer, newspaper columnist, biographer, painter and poet
Marcel Stellman (1925–2021), Belgian record producer and lyricist
Martin Stellman (born 1948), British screenwriter and director